That's Life is a musical comedy series that appeared on the ABC television network in 1968–69, starring Robert Morse and E. J. Peaker as Bobby and Gloria Dickson. Well-known stars often guest-starred in one-time roles.

The series focused on the lives of Bobby and Gloria, from their first meeting through their marriage, as their lives progressed, through Gloria's pregnancy and childbirth, as well as Bobby's work experiences at the Miller Chalk Company. Characters often broke into song, in the manner of musical plays and movies. Songs included well-known numbers (for example, Morse doing a duet with an office computer on "Anything You Can Do," and guest star Ethel Merman with a rendition of "Think Pink" (from the movie Funny Face)) and original tunes written for the program itself (a probable reason the episodes have never been released to home video, as rights would need to be secured for the songs; a handful of clips have been posted to YouTube).

Kay Medford had a recurring role as Gloria's mother, Mrs. Quigley, who was often antagonistic to Bobby; Agnes Moorehead (at the time a co-star of ABC's hit sitcom Bewitched) appeared as Bobby's mother in one episode.

Guest stars 

 George Burns
 Sid Caesar
 Paul Ford
 Phil Harris
 Goldie Hawn
 Paul Lynde
 Agnes Moorehead
 Ethel Merman
 Tony Randall
 Dick Shawn
 Phil Silvers
 Leslie Uggams
 Betty White
 Jackie Vernon

References

External links

1968 American television series debuts
1969 American television series endings
American Broadcasting Company original programming